Kaja Korošec (born 17 November 2001) is a Slovenian footballer who plays as a midfielder for ŽNK Mura and the Slovenia women's national team.

Club career

Korošec made her first senior appearance for Pomurje in the 2017–18 season, going on to make four league appearances in that campaign. On 21 October 2018, she scored her first league goal for the club in a 15–1 victory over Ajdovščina. The 2018–19 season brought Korošec her first league title, and also won the double after winning the Slovenian Cup. Korošec scored 8 goals in 21 appearances across the course of the season to help ensure success.

In August 2019, Korošec made her UEFA Women's Champions League debut as Pomurje faced Cardiff Met. On 18 November 2020, she scored a hat-trick in the Champions League match against Hungarian champions Ferencváros as Pomurje advanced to the round of 32.

International career
Korošec has been capped for the Slovenia national team, first appearing for the team during the 2019 FIFA Women's World Cup qualifying cycle. Her first competitive appearance came in November 2017 in a 5–0 victory over Faroe Islands shortly after her 16th birthday.

On 4 October 2019, Korošec scored her first international goal in a 4–2 defeat against the Netherlands in the UEFA Women's Euro 2022 qualifiers.

Honours
Pomurje
 Slovenian League: 2018–19, 2020–21, 2021–22
 Slovenian Cup: 2017–18, 2018–19

References

External links
 
 
 

2001 births
Living people
Slovenian women's footballers
Slovenia women's international footballers
Women's association football midfielders
ŽNK Mura players